Ancylus regularis is a species of very small, freshwater, air-breathing limpet, an aquatic pulmonate gastropod mollusk in the tribe Ancylini within the family Planorbidae, the ram's horn snails and their allies. This species is endemic to Ethiopia.

References

Planorbidae
Endemic fauna of Ethiopia
Gastropods described in 1973
Taxonomy articles created by Polbot